Ashtamudi Lake (Ashtamudi Kayal), in the Kollam District of the Indian state of Kerala, is the most visited backwater and lake in the state. It possesses a unique wetland ecosystem and a large palm-shaped (also described as octopus-shaped) water body, second only in size to the Vembanad estuary ecosystem of the state. Ashtamudi means 'eight braids' (Ashta : 'eight'; mudi : 'hair braids') in the local Malayalam language. The name is indicative of the lake's topography with its multiple branches. The lake is also called the gateway to the backwaters of Kerala and is well known for its houseboat and backwater resorts.
Ashtamudi Wetland was included in the list of wetlands of international importance, as defined by the Ramsar Convention for the conservation and sustainable utilization of wetlands.

Along both banks of the lake and its backwater canals, coconut groves and palm trees interspersed with towns and villages are seen. Kollam, (formerly Quilon) is an important historic port city located on the right bank of the lake. Boat cruises are operated by the Kollam Boat Club from Kollam to Alappuzha providing transport access to many other towns and villages along this route. Luxury houseboats also operate on the lake. The boat journey is an 8-hour trip, winding through lakes, canals and water bound villages. Chinese fishing nets, called cheena vala in Malayalam, are used by local fisherman and are a common sight along the waterway.

The lake and the city of Kollam on its banks and the Neendakara port at the confluence offer a means of transport for the state's trade and commerce in the cashew trading and processing industry as well as the marine products industry.

The lake is the source of livelihood of many people living close by. Fishing, coconut husk retting for coir production and inland navigation services are the prominent businesses.

In 2014, the Clam Governing Council of Ashtamudi lake became the first Marine Stewardship Council certified fishery in India for their sustainable clam fishing.

The lake and the life on its shores have inspired many artists and writers. It has been the subject of many poems by the renowned poet Thirunalloor Karunakaran who was born and brought up on its banks.

History 
Quilon or Kollam and inevitably Ashtamudi lake's importance is claimed to be dated to the days of the Romans and the Phoenicians. Ibn Batuta, during his 24-year sojourn in the 14th century, is reported to have mentioned about the Quilon port as one of the five ports for Chinese trade. Links with Persia (9th century), Chinese mandarin in 1275 AD, Portuguese in 1502 AD, and the Dutch followed British in 1795 AD are recorded history. Velu Thampi is credited with organizing the rebellion against the British from this place.

Access 
National Highway 47 (NH 47) passes through the lake periphery not only from Quilon but also to other locations on its bank from Thiruvananthapuram to the northern towns of Kerala. Southern Railways network of lines connects Quilon with all important centres in the rest of the country. Ferry services operate daily to Alleppey and boats operate to all villages located in the canals of the backwater system. Famous Paravur estuary and backwaters are just 21 kilometer away from Ashtamudi.

Topography

Kallada River is a major river discharging into the Ashtamudi Lake. The Kallada river, which originates near Ponmudi from the Kulathupuzha hills Western Ghats  is formed by the confluence of three rivers, viz., Kulathupuzha, Chenthurnipuzha, and Kalthuruthipuzha, and after traversing a distance of about  through virgin forests finally debouches into the Ashtamudi wetland at Peringalam near Kollam.

Geology 
Quaternary and Tertiary sediments and sedimentary rocks are the formations in the lake basin and environs. The Quaternary sediments are of marine and fluvial alluvium of recent age. Tertiary sediments comprise laterite, sandstones and clays of Warkalai formation.

Hydrology 

The average annual runoff from the river system into the estuary is reported to be 76 cubic kilometers of freshwater. The basin drainage area is 1,700 km2 (660 mi2) and with an average annual rainfall of 2400 mm (94 in) it discharges 3.375 km3 (2,740,000 ac·ft) of flow annually. It acts as a flood storage lake thus protecting the thickly populated city of Quilon (Kollam) and the coastal land. The Kallada dam built across the Kallada river is 85.3 m high by 35 m long (280 ft by 115 ft) with a reservoir area of 23 km2 (8.9 mi2) with a storage volume of 0.505 km3 (409,000 ac·ft). Though it provides irrigation to 61630 ha for paddy and upland crops, it has aggravated the salinity ingress into the wetland and the river due to reduced outflows during summer months.

The climate is hot and humid during April–May while cool during December–January.

Flora
Ashtamudi Estuary has mangroves Avicennia officinalis, Brugiera gymnorrhiza and Sonneratia caseolaris as also 43 species of marshy and mangrove associates including two endangered species Syzygium travancoricum (endangered species according to the Red Data Book of Indian Plants) and Calamus rotang in the Terrestrial system. These species offer excellent scope for development of marine bioreserve to promote eco-tourism in the estuarine of the lake. IUCN lists the two endangered species in IUCN 2008. The total number of Syzygium travancoricum is reported to be very small, not more than 200. The major threats to the endangered species are reportedly draining of the wet lands and conversion into paddy fields.

Wildlife
The lake supports 57 species of avifauna, of which 6 are migratory and 51 resident species. It is also reported that about 40 species of wetland-dependent birds are recorded in the lake, out of which 45% are long-distance migrants. Terns, plovers, cormorants, and herons are most abundant birds in the lake.
A study report has identified 45 insect species, including 26 species of butterfly, 5 odonates, 9 hymenopteras, and 2 orthopterans, 1 hemipteran and 2 coleopterans. About 29 zooplankton species have also been identified.
The water body is found to have 9 phytoplanktons such as Amphora, Borosigma, Cyclotella, Cymbella, Gyrozigma, Meloziva, Navicula and Nitzschi.

World Wildlife Fund (WWF) reports 97 species of fish (42 are typically marine, 3 estuarine, 9 estuarine-riverine, 15 marine-estuarine) and unique copepod species. It is also a congenial habitat for all species of penaeid and palaemonid Prawns, edible crabs, paphia malabarica (short neck Clams) and a variety of fish.
A comparative shell morphology study of short-neck clam Paphia malabarica,  the main clam fishery resources in the Ashtamudi Lake re-assigned to the genus Marcia recens (Venus Clams) and this study found it was wrongly identified as short-neck clam in previous studies. Clams found in the estuary are exported. The estuary is the source of livelihood for thousands of fishermen and is stated to be the second biggest fish-landing centre after the Vembanad estuary.

Islands in the lake

Munroe Island (Munroethuruth) is a cluster of eight tiny islands in Ashtamudi Lake.

Effluent from the factories is reported to be causing pollution of the lake waters.

Thekkumbhagom island, situated on the bank of the Ashtamudi Lake, provides the feel of rustic life of a village. The significance of this village is because the first epic poetry in the Malayalam language, Ramachandravilasam, was composed by the poet Azhakath Padmanabha Kurup in this village. An ancient 1000-year-old temple and a 200-year-old church are located here.

Economic evaluation of the lake's resources 
An evaluation of the marketed use benefits of Ashtamudi estuary (valued using market valuation approach) has assessed the total direct use value at Rs.66.8 million per annum; coconut husk retting accounts for Rs.5.1 million, Inland navigation service accounts for Rs.3.7 million and the recreation benefit is assessed at Rs.1.5 million (using the standard travel cost method). But this is reported to be showing a downward trend, particularly in fish resources in the estuary. This evaluation provides an insight into the economic importance of conserving Ashtamudi estuary.

Deterioration of the lake environment 

The following are reported to be the reasons for deterioration of the lake environment:

Intense anthropogenic pressure.
Oil spills from thousands of fishing boats and from industries in the surrounding area.
Dwindling of the fragile lake zone due to conversion/destruction of natural habitats for development purposes (reported that the lake which had an area of 54 km2 [21 mi2] according to old survey reports has shrunk to 34 km2 [13 mi2] due to encroachments)
Large quantities of untreated sewage, disposal of human excreta, and the pollution from paper mills, industries (aluminum, ceramics, seafood), as well as from coconut husk retting.
Many fish species may have become extinct due to lack of spawning facilities on the banks of the lake due to canalization of the lake's banks by walls built of laterite and granite stones (these walls reportedly cover 80 per cent of the lake's banks)

Extinction of Kanjiracode creek 
Kanjiracode creek on the south-east end of the lake, one arm of the Ashtamudi, has suffered extinction due to the dumping of waste earth and clay into the lake by the Kerala Ceramics Limited (KCL) at Kundara, a state government-owned public sector unit. A university professor who has studied this aspect wonders whether the lake would have to be soon rechristened "Sapthamudi" or the lake with seven locks of hair.The loss to people due to destruction of the creek is stated to be:

a) "Karimeen" (pearl spot) and "kanambu" (mullet) fish varieties once the livelihood of fishermen have disappeared and resulting in the migration of the fishermen to Paravur and Varkala in the south and even Kannur in the north.

b) People dependent on coir for a livelihood used the lake to soak husks but now the Kanjiracode coir industry is non-existent due to closure of the creek resulting in migration of coir workers to other places for a living.

Restoration plans

The Asia Development Assistance Facility of the New Zealand Government has carried out a study with the objective of evolving a management plan for sustainable management of the estuary for ecosystem development. The shores of the lake are home to important species of rare birds and animals. Any decisions made concerning the Ashtamudi Estuary's resources and its sustainable management significance is dictated by about a million people who live on its shores and the large species of rare birds and animals which provide the equally important biodiversity to the lake's environs. The Plan envisages:

 Identify and phase out of the pollution sources
 Better sanitation, reduction of industrial growth and reduction of urban waste to ensure the maintainable water quality of the estuary.
 Address the declining fish stock production through concerted efforts to conserve the fish stock of the estuary in a sustainable manner and with community participation
 Product diversification of coir to ensure better economic returns to people with the coordination of self-help groups
 Improved shore protection through mangrove afforestation for ecosystem development on the banks of the estuary
 Mining to be allowed selectively at village level, away from the banks of the lake
 Discontinue estuary reclamation
 Set defined navigation routes undisturbed by fishing nets
 Neendakara port to be provided with improved sanitation facilities, enhanced boat-fuelling terminals and drainage terminals.
 Promote ecotourism with better facilities of inland navigation and services in the form of:
developing of marine bio-reserve, nature island and mangrove conservation area
visits to temples nearby and other places of cultural and archeological importance
visits to coir-producing villages, rubber-producing villages, rice fields, fish hatcheries and other biodiversity hot spots

The above activities have been suggested for implementation in the Vellimon Kayal, a relatively unspoiled part of the estuary.

With funds provided by the Union Ministry of Environment and Forests, revival of mangrove forests was done which is reported to be partially successful (out of 2,40,000 mangrove saplings planted over a period of two years 30,000 are reported to be surviving).

Gallery

References

External links 

 Ashtamudi Lake on World Wildlife Fund-India website

Tourist attractions in Kollam
Lakes of Kollam
Reservoirs in Kerala
Ramsar sites in India
Kallada River
Geography of Kollam district
Lakes in Kollam